Irina Loghin (born February 19, 1939) is a Romanian singer and politician, known as the best-selling artist from her domain in Romania.

Born in Gura Vitioarei, Prahova County, she had a career as a folk music soloist. In the early 1980s, due to a wish expressed by Elena Ceaușescu, who was jealous of Loghin's popularity, the latter was forbidden from performing on stage, and was unable to do so until after the Romanian Revolution. She joined the Greater Romania Party in 1998, and in 2000, she was elected to the Chamber of Deputies for a Dolj County seat. In 2004, she was elected to the Senate for a Giurgiu County seat.

She and her husband Ion Cernea have a son and a daughter.

In 2015 the artist was chosen by Walt Disney Pictures to provide the Romanian voice of a witch in the animated movie The Black Cauldron.

Notes

External links

 Official site

Living people
1939 births
People from Prahova County
Romanian folk singers
Romanian women singers
Greater Romania Party politicians
Members of the Chamber of Deputies (Romania)
Members of the Senate of Romania
Recipients of the Order of Honour (Moldova)